Belaventura is a Brazilian telenovela produced by Casablanca and broadcast by RecordTV. Created and written by Gustavo Reiz. It premiered on July 25, 2017, replacing the rerun of A Escrava Isaura, and ended on January 26, 2018, replaced by the rerun of Os Dez Mandamentos. It stars Bernardo Velasco, Rayanne Morais, and Camila Rodrigues.

Set in medieval times, the telenovela shows a history of love established between a prince and a plebeian, who survives in a chaotic kingdom called Belaventura, where numerous conflicts and wars are proclaimed and whose castle is surrounded by guards.

Synopsis
At the beginning of the 15th century, the millennial war between Redenção and Valedo - led by the dukes Otoniel and Severo - finally comes to an end with a peace agreement to unify them, creating the kingdom of Belaventura. Otoniel is crowned as a king after a medieval tournament dispute. Otoniel is the father of the prince-heir Enrico, noble Lizabeta and the bitter Carmona, who detests her brother in secret for not being chosen as a successor to the throne. She is willing to do anything to get the crown. They are all Queen Vitoriana's children who is mysteriously poisoned during the tournament and dies. Severo is blamed for her death and is forced to disappear for many years. The young heirs were taken care of by Elia, a nanny who never had children. As a young, ten-year-old boy Enrico meets Pietra, a peasant for whom he falls in love and can no longer forget.

Fifteen years passes and Pietra is now a strong girl, who was raised by Biniek, her drunken stepfather who mistreats her. Her mother Lucy disappeared after constant attacks from the Pure Order, an inquisitorial group that promotes witch-hunt, led by the machiavellian Cedric, who is also the king's advisor.

Soon, Enrico meets Pietra again after a long time and the two, given to forbidden love, decide to fight together, even if it culminates in Enrico renouncing the throne. The couple's mentor and protector is Bartolion, the kingdom's sage, who knows all the powerful secrets and helps them in the mission to unite royalty and peasants. Severo also returns to the kingdom with a heart filled with hatred and revenge, being increasingly manipulated by hise wife Marion, an ambitious and disingenuous duchess, who has never accepted the fact that she did not become queen. Marion intends to use all devices to achieve her goals and to maneuver her husband to conspire against Otoniel. She is also Fernão's lover, family counselor, although she has never been accepted by Severo's mother Leocadia. She waits for the right moment to unmask her. Marion and Severo are parents to Jacques, Arturo and Brione, who lives a hidden romance with a commoner Gonzalo.

Everything will change with the arrival of Selena, a determined archer, that will cause twists in this beautiful and compelling fairytale.

Cast
 Bernardo Velasco as Enrico Montebelo e Luxemburgo
 Rayanne Morais as Pietra Florenza
Camila Rodrigues as Carmona Montebelo e Luxemburgo
 Leandro Lima as Jacques de Alencastro Bourbon
 Adriana Birolli as Lizabeta Montebelo e Luxemburgo
 Helena Fernandes as Marión Alencastro Bourbon
 Giuseppe Oristanio as Cedric
 Juliana Didone as Brione de Alencastro Bourbon
 Kadu Moliterno as Otoniel Montebelo e Luxemburgo II
 Floriano Peixoto as Severo Alencastro Bourbon
 Giselle Itié as Selena
 Larissa Maciel as Lucy Florenza
 Esther Góes as Leocádia de Alencastro Bourbon
 Alexandre Slaviero as Gonzalo Castroneves
 Bemvindo Sequeira as Páris La Rosie
 Angelina Muniz as Matriona Mascate
 Alexandre Barillari as Tácitus Mascate
 Eri Johnson as Corinto
 André Mattos as Falstaff
 Bárbara Borges as Polentina Alvarez
 Paulo Gorgulho as Bartolion
 Leonardo Franco as Mistral

Guests
 Juliana Knust as Vitoriana Montebelo e Luxemburgo
 Bia Passos as Young Pietra
 Gabriel Ferrarini as Young Enrico
 Rafaella Maia as Young Lizabeta
 Luis Augusto Formal as Young Jacques
 Luiz Eduardo Toledo as Young Gonzalo

Ratings

References

External links
 
  

2017 telenovelas
Brazilian telenovelas
RecordTV telenovelas
2017 Brazilian television series debuts
2018 Brazilian television series endings
Portuguese-language telenovelas
Television series set in the 15th century